The Privilege of Parliament Act 1512 or the Parliamentary Privilege Act 1512 (4 Hen 8 c 8), commonly known as Strode's Act, is an Act of the Parliament of England. It enacted parliamentary privilege in law, prohibiting any suit or prosecution from being brought or punishment being imposed against any MP or peer for speaking on any matter in parliament.

The Act was originally a private act, passed in response to Strode's case, in which Strode had been imprisoned for obstructing tin mining, namely by introducing a bill for improving the working conditions of tin miners. In 1667, Parliament declared it to be of more general application. The privilege was later strengthened and generalized by the Bill of Rights 1689.

This Act was retained for the Republic of Ireland by section 2(2)(a) of, and Part 2 of Schedule 1 to, the Statute Law Revision Act 2007.

Section 2
The words from "ov that" to "auctoritie", wherever those words occurred in this section, were repealed by section 1(1) of, and Part I of the Schedule to, the Statute Law Revision Act 1888.

References
Halsbury's Statutes,

External links
The Privilege of Parliament Act 1512, as amended, from the National Archives.
List of legislative effects in the Republic of Ireland from the Irish Statute Book.

Acts of the Parliament of England (1485–1603)
1512 in law
1512 in England